In Rwanda We Say…The Family That Does Not Speak Dies is a documentary film examining the Gacaca justice process in the aftermath of the  Rwandan genocide against the Tutsi in 1994. Directed by Anne Aghion and produced by Gacaca Productions, this 2004 film won an Emmy Award for "Outstanding Informational Programming." Filmed in Rwanda, the language of In Rwanda is Kinyarwanda with English subtitles.

Synopsis
Set in Rwanda, Anne Aghion, the director, interviews a genocide offender who has been released back into his community, and the victims of the genocide. The film follows how at first, the coexistence between the people who instigated the genocide and the victimized people is unbearable. Many of the victims feel rage toward their former oppressors. But gradually, the victims and oppressors start talking to the camera, and then to each other as they start the difficult task of living with each other. The documentary portrays how the people's spirits cannot be crushed by the Rwandan genocide, the 1994 mass killing of hundreds of thousands of Rwanda's minority Tutsi and the moderates of its Hutu majority by the Interahamwe and the Impuzamugambi.

References

External links 
 
 
 

2004 films
Rwandan short documentary films
Kinyarwanda-language films
2004 short documentary films
Emmy Award-winning programs
Documentary films about the Rwandan genocide
Films directed by Anne Aghion